Bushehri is a Persian surname. People with the surname include:

 Gholam Ali Safai Bushehri (born 1959), Iranian cleric 
 Habib Meftah Bushehri (born 1978), Iranian musician
 Hashem Hosseini Bushehri (born 1956), Iranian cleric
 Javad Bushehri (1893–1972), Iranian businessman and statesman

Persian-language surnames
Toponymic surnames